Abayomi Gabriel Olonisakin   (born 2 December 1961) is a retired Nigerian army general, former Chief of Defence Staff, and current Nigerian Ambassador to the Republic of Cameroon.  He was appointed to the position of Chief of Defense Staff on 13 July 2015 by President Muhammadu Buhari. He resigned from office on 26 January 2021.

Early life and education
General Olonisakin who hails from Ekiti State had his elementary and secondary education in Zaria. The third of five children, Olonisakin grew up in the Odo Ijebu Quarters of Ode Ekiti, Gbonyin local government area, Ekiti State, where his parents were active member of the local CMS church. He enrolled at the Nigerian Military School, Zaria in 1973 and later joined the Nigerian Defence Academy as a member of the 25th Regular Combatant Course. He was commissioned as a 2nd Lieutenant into the Nigerian Army Signal Corps in 1981. Olonisakin holds a Bachelor of Science degree with honours in Electrical and Electronics Engineering from Obafemi Awolowo University in Ife.

Career
Prior to his appointment as Chief of Defence Staff, General Olonisakin was commander of the following formations

 TRADOC
 Nigerian Army Corps of Signals 

Olonisakin was promoted to General in August 2015 by President Muhammadu Buhari upon his confirmation as Chief of Defence Staff.

Awards
In October 2022, a Nigerian national honour of Commander of the Order of the Federal Republic (CFR) was conferred on him by President Muhammadu Buhari.

References 

Living people
Nigerian generals
Nigerian Defence Academy alumni
Nigerian Military School alumni
Nigerian military personnel
People from Ekiti State
Obafemi Awolowo University alumni
1961 births
Nigerian diplomats